Sea Life Park Hawaii is a marine mammal park, bird sanctuary and aquarium in Waimānalo near Makapuʻu Point, north of Hanauma Bay on the island of Oahu in Hawaii, United States. The park first opened in 1964, and includes exhibits that let visitors interact with the animals by swimming with dolphins, sea lions, and rays, taking a sea safari in the aquarium, and feeding the sea turtles. The park was acquired in 2008 and is operated by Palace Entertainment, the U.S. subsidiary of Parques Reunidos from Dolphin Discovery, which had acquired it in 2005.

Exhibits and facilities

The Hawaiian Reef Aquarium is a  tank that is home to more than 2000 reef animals, including sharks, stingrays, turtles, and schools of tropical fish.

The Hawaiian Ocean Theater is the venue for the main shows, which includes dolphins, penguins, and sea lions. The shows include information about the newest training techniques and about the park's conservation efforts.

The Penguin Habitat is home to the park's penguins, which are part of the Association of Zoos and Aquariums Species Survival Plan for the Humboldt penguin.

Visitors can interact with the animals at the Sea Turtle Feeding Pool, Sting Ray Lagoon, Swim with the Sea Lions and Swim with dolphins pools.

The Dolphin Cove Show features an open-air theater from which visitors can watch dolphin performances.

The Bird Sanctuary is home to many wild marine birds including "iwa" (great frigatebirds), boobys, shearwaters, and albatrosses, most of which came to the sanctuary sick or injured. Visitors can see how these birds are cared for and rehabilitated.

The Hawaiian Monk Seal Habitat lets visitors see these native animals, and interact with the trainers before and after the shows.

Activities

Sea Life Park Hawaii includes several programs that let visitors interact directly with the animals in the water. All programs are run several times daily.

Dolphin Royal Swim Program, Dolphin Swim Adventure, Dolphin Encounter, and Dolphin Aloha all let visitors interact directly with dolphins in the water.
Sea Lion Discovery lets visitors swim and play with sea lions in the water. Visitors are also taught the signalling system used by the trainers to communicate with these animals.
Sea Trek Adventure is an underwater stroll in the Hawaiian Reef Tank, surrounded by eels, stingrays, sea turtles, and numerous other reef species.
Ray Training Demonstration is and experience where you can train stingrays and interact with them and perform operant conditioning.
Penguin Habitat & Penguin Trainer Talk Be able to interact with penguins and hear a brief history of them as well as learn how they swim and play with each other.
Park Conservation Tour Wonderful Tour around the park and has educational history of each creature and the history on how it ties with the park on the conservation and preservation to marine life
Shark Encounter Adventure Tour Visitors will receive a narrated tour of the East Side of the Island and scuba diving with Hawaiian Sharks with transportation in a chauffeur driven style, newer model, all black, air-conditioned, and fully insured, Royal Hawaiian Limousine luxury vehicle!

Conservation

Sea Life Park Hawaii is active in several conservation areas, including the release of adolescent green sea turtles that were hatched and raised at the park, hundreds of which are released into the wild each year. The park's last spinner dolphin was released in 1983.

Gallery

References

External links

1964 establishments in Hawaii
Aquaria in Hawaii
Buildings and structures in Honolulu County, Hawaii
Zoos in Hawaii
Tourist attractions in Honolulu County, Hawaii
Zoos established in 1964
Buildings and structures completed in 1964
Palace Entertainment